Mike E. Clark's Extra Pop Emporium is a remix album by Mike E. Clark and Insane Clown Posse, released August 14, 2012 prepackaged with the White Pop variant edition of The Mighty Death Pop!

Background 

On April 20, 2012, Psychopathic Records released an infomercial for the album The Mighty Death Pop!, announcing that it will be available in three separate editions, each with a variant color cover and prepackaged with a bonus album. The third variant, the White Pop edition, contains the remix album Mike E. Clark's Extra Pop Emporium, which features remixes, outtakes and leftover songs recorded during The Mighty Death Pop! sessions; these tracks include appearances by Kottonmouth Kings, Three 6 Mafia, Color Me Badd, Ice Cube, Scarface, Geto Boys, Twiztid, Kreayshawn, Swollen Members, Willie D, Jamie Madrox, & Blaze Ya Dead Homie.

On July 19, 2012, 30 second snippets of The Mighty Death Pop!, Mike E. Clark's Extra Pop Emporium, and the other two bonus albums pre-packaged with The Mighty Death Pop! were released on amazon.com. A day later, the snippets were removed from the website per Psychopathic Records' request. On August 8, the album along with The Mighty Death Pop! and its other bonus albums were all released early during the 13th Annual Gathering of the Juggalos.

"Birfday Party" originally had plans of including Das Racist, but despite Heems liking the idea of the track, Kool A.D. decided it wouldn't make for a good idea. "Shugston Brooks 1959–2004" included a sample of REO Speedwagon's "Take It on the Run".

The Insane Clown Posse initially planned to have the remix of "When I'm Clownin'" from the Extra Pop Emporium as a single music video from that album, but they ultimately nixed that plan when Kreayshawn didn't return their calls to appear in their music video. They replaced her verse in their music video with a cameo appearance from Boondox and a new verse by Danny Brown.

Production 
Mike E. Clark's Extra Pop Emporium features several songs originally considered for inclusion on The Mighty Death Pop!. These outtakes include "Up Ya Ass", "Birfday Party", "Playin' In The Woods", and "Shugston Brooks 1959–2004". The liner notes include explanations as to why each track was not featured on the main album, as well as stories on how every track came to its fruition. A few songs from The Mighty Death Pop! were not only remixed by Mike E. Clark, but also remixed by Brian Kuma & Joe Strange. Each remix includes at least one additional artist.

Reception 

Reviewing The Mighty Death Pop! for The Daily Blam, Kevin Skinner favorably reviewed Mike E. Clark's Extra Pop Emporium, writing "many of the tracks come off even stronger than their standard album counterparts."

Track listing 

The track listing for the bonus album Mike E. Clark's Extra Pop Emporium has been confirmed to contain 13 tracks as part of the Mighty Death Pop infomercial. On June 30, 2012, the confirmed track listing for Mike E. Clark's Extra Pop Emporium was released.

References

External links
 Official website
 Bowski Graphics (Album Cover Designer)

2012 remix albums
Albums produced by Mike E. Clark
Psychopathic Records remix albums

ru:The Mighty Death Pop!
simple:The Mighty Death Pop!